Gyula Bádonyi (17 September 1882 – 6 June 1944) was a footballer, first goalkeeper of the Hungarian national team.

Career

At clubs
A thin, high and fast player, Bádonyi used his hands as well. At his time there was a slogen: “Only drunk men lie on the grass!” H was a striker as well, he played well with his head. He started at BTC in 1898. He was among the founders of Budapesti Postás SE. He played here from 1899 to 1901, when he returned to his original club, which won the Hungarian Cup. He left the ground in 1906, maturated in commerce and worked for Magyar Posta.

At the national team 
On 12 October 1902, he played goalkeeper in the first ever match for the Hungary national team against Austria. He never returned to the national team.

External links 
 1902: első meccsén ötöt kapott a magyar válogatott
 Domonkos már vetődni is mert

Források 
 Révai új lexikona I. (A–Baj). Főszerk. Kollega Tarsoly István. Szekszárd: Babits. 1996. 844. o. 
 Új magyar életrajzi lexikon I. (A–Cs). Főszerk. Markó László. Budapest: Magyar Könyvklub. 2001. 251. o. 
 Antal Zoltán – Hoffer József: Alberttől Zsákig, Budapest, Sportkiadó, 1968

1882 births
1944 deaths
People from Szerencs
Hungarian footballers
Hungary international footballers
Association football goalkeepers
Sportspeople from Borsod-Abaúj-Zemplén County